Anthony Seigler (born June 20, 1999) is an American professional baseball catcher in the New York Yankees organization.

Amateur career
Seigler attended Cartersville High School in Cartersville, Georgia. As a senior, he posted a 1.09 ERA in  innings along with batting .421 with 14 home runs. He committed and signed to play college baseball at the University of Florida.

Professional career
Although a switch pitcher and switch hitter with infield and outfield experience, Seigler said "I feel catching is what's going to get me to the next level". Expected to be drafted late in the first round, he was drafted 23rd overall by the New York Yankees in the 2018 Major League Baseball draft and signed with the team on June 9 for the slot-valued bonus of $2.8 million. 

He made his professional debut with the Gulf Coast League Yankees, and after 12 games was promoted to the Pulaski Yankees. In 24 games between the two clubs, he batted .266 with one home run and nine RBIs. He spent the 2019 season with the Charleston RiverDogs, batting .175 with six RBIs over thirty games. He missed nearly the last two months the season due to injury. He played only 41 games in 2021 due to injuries, slashing .219/.324/.391 with four home runs and 24 RBIs.

References

External links

1999 births
Living people
People from Cartersville, Georgia
Sportspeople from the Atlanta metropolitan area
Baseball players from Georgia (U.S. state)
Baseball catchers
Gulf Coast Yankees players
Pulaski Yankees players
Charleston RiverDogs players
Hudson Valley Renegades players
Tampa Tarpons players